Oleksiy Volodymyrovych Antyukhin (born 25 November 1971 in Zaporizhya) is a retired Ukrainian professional footballer.

Career
Antyukhin played professional football for SC Tavriya Simferopol, FC Dynamo Kyiv and FC Vorskla Poltava.

International career
He played his only game for the Ukraine national football team on 9 April 1996 in a friendly match against Moldova.

References

External links 

Soviet footballers
Ukrainian footballers
Ukraine international footballers
FC Metalurh Zaporizhzhia players
FC Vorskla Poltava players
SC Tavriya Simferopol players
FC Torpedo Zaporizhzhia players
FC Dynamo Kyiv players
FC Elista players
Ukrainian expatriate footballers
FC Chernomorets Novorossiysk players
Russian Premier League players
FC Dynamo Stavropol players
Ukrainian Premier League players
Expatriate footballers in Russia
Ukrainian football managers
1971 births
Living people
Ukrainian Cup top scorers
Association football forwards
Ukrainian expatriate sportspeople in Russia